Gallotia goliath (the Tenerife giant lizard or goliath Tenerife lizard) is an extinct giant lizard species from the island of Tenerife of the Canary Islands, Spain. It was described by the German herpetologist Robert Mertens. Fossils of this lizard have been found in volcanic caves, where they often appear with those of other animals, like the Tenerife giant rat.

Classification 
Prehistoric Gallotia remains have been assigned to the taxa G. maxima and G. goliath, the former supposedly occurring only on Tenerife, the latter on several islands. It was eventually determined, however, that G. maxima is a junior synonym of G. goliath, and that the latter was close to the El Hierro giant lizard (Gallotia simonyi); supposed goliath specimens from El Hierro, La Gomera, and La Palma (from the Cuevas de los Murciélagos) are probably just extremely large individuals of, respectively, the El Hierro, La Gomera (Gallotia bravoana) and La Palma (Gallotia auaritae) giant lizards. Based on DNA sequence analysis of mummified remains, G. goliath is a valid species that probably was restricted to Tenerife, and apparently was closer to the Tenerife speckled lizard (Gallotia intermedia) than to the El Hierro giant lizard.

Characteristics 
G. goliath was the largest reptile in the Canary Islands, reaching a length of  but based on the finding of a  skull in 1952, there could have been even larger specimens. These giant lizards inhabited the coastal lowlands of the island.

Extinction 
It inhabited Tenerife from the late Pleistocene through the Holocene until the fifteenth century of our era. Bone remains of this species have been found in different archaeological sites with marks that show that they were consumed by the aborigines of the island (Guanches). There is written documentation about its existence in the fifteenth century, so its extinction must have occurred in the years after the conquest of the Canaries by the Castilians.

Gallery

See also 
 Island gigantism
 List of largest extinct lizards

Notes

References 
 
 

Reptiles of the Canary Islands
Holocene extinctions
Gallotia
Extinct animals of Africa
Taxa named by Robert Mertens